The People's Alliance is a political party in Fiji. The party was formed in 2021 by Sitiveni Rabuka who served as Prime Minister of Fiji from 1992 to 1999 and again from December 2022.

Background 
Sitiveni Rabuka served as the leader of the Social Democratic Liberal Party (SODELPA) from June 2016 till November 2020 where he was ousted in a leadership contest. He resigned as leader of the opposition that same year and subsequently left SODELPA to form a new party.

Formation 
Founded by 11 members including Sitiveni Rabuka, the party was registered on 12 August 2021 and subsequently launched on 11 October 2021. On 9 April 2022, the party appointed Manoa Kamikamica as its Deputy Party Leader. Lynda Tabuya and Daniel Lobendahn were also appointed as deputy party leaders on 7 May 2022.

2022 election 
The party ran 55 candidates in the 2022 Fijian general election. On 8 April 2022, the party signed a memorandum of understanding with the National Federation Party indicating an agreement to work together post-election. The People's Alliance gained 21 seats becoming the second largest party in Parliament. It's coalition partner NFP secured 5 seats. Both parties with their shared number of seats failed to secure a parliamentary majority. Ultimately, SODELPA chose the People's Alliance and its coalition partner and a three-party coalition government was formed.

Electoral history

Parliamentary elections

Leadership 
The party leader and deputy leaders are appointed by the People's Executive Council which serves as the governing body of the party. The party has three deputy leaders, in accordance with its constitution. Since the party's formation in 2021, Sitiveni Rabuka is the leader of the party. Serving as his deputy leaders are Manoa Kamikamica, Lynda Tabuya and Daniel Lobendahn.

Party leader

Deputy party leaders

References

External links 
Official website

2021 establishments in Fiji
Political parties established in 2021
Political parties in Fiji